The Catacombs Nightclub was a gay after-hours club in Philadelphia that played underground dance music, which was the precursor to house music.  Additionally, Catacombs was responsible for the creation of the dance music genre "Philly Classics." The club was a haven and cultural center for music industry professionals and artists of diverse backgrounds in the early '80s.

History 

Second Story, Philadelphia's premier nightclub, was located at 12th and Walnut Streets in Center City Philadelphia. The Story, as it was lovingly called by the weekly regulars—was the vision of brothers Barry Geftman and Wayne Geftman. The Geftman brothers’ original concept was to create a private, gay club with an environment featuring unique interiors, superior music, excellent sound, and innovative lighting. Under the banner of Disco Design, LTD., Wayne oversaw most of the creative and technical aspects of the club, while Barry deftly performed administrative duties, including staffing and promotions. As brothers, they were able to harness a natural synergy, which was the primary key to their success.

Before Second Story was realized, Wayne and Barry had created their first nightclub, the Music Box. The club was one of the most popular spots at Jersey Shore during summers in the 1970s. New York's “Discoteckin Magazine” called it “a club worth leaving New York for.”

The sound system was designed by Rosner Custom Sound and was installed by Rosner's lead engineer—Donald Carucci, known as an expert in the field of nightclub sound. The Music Box's sound system was unparalleled, and Wayne and DJ Frankie “Who” Sestito frequently turned the music up, which further cemented the club's popularity. With the success of the Music Box at the Jersey Shore, the Geftman brothers realized that it was time to bring their concepts to Philadelphia; hence, the Second Story was born.

Second Story opened its doors on December 6, 1976, after three years of intense design. The facility was in a former church, and key elements from the original building were utilized in its interior design. Rosner designed a state-of-the-art sound system, featuring components that, at the time, were rarely used in the nightclub environment. The light show was also designed with meticulous care, under Barry's close scrutiny. The club opened as a private, gay nightclub. It changed to a more mainstream format after 13 months, which led to unprecedented success and to its reputation as “Philadelphia’s Studio 54.”  

Although Second Story was a commercial success, Wayne's love of music compelled him to build another club—one that featured “hardcore” dance music, then popular in after-hours gay juice bars. Later, this style of music was recognized as the precursor to house music, and Wayne's musical vision helped shape the dance genre Philly Classics.

The Geftman brothers opened Catacombs in the fall of 1978 in the basement of the 12th Street structure. The club typically opened on Saturdays at midnight, and it would not close until Sunday around noon sometimes. The first record played at Catacombs was "The Impossible Dream".

Although there remains some confusion over who installed and designed the sound system in Catacombs, the truth is that it was the original sound system from the Music Box. Wayne updated the system by doubling the number of loudspeakers and amplifiers. Designed and installed by Donald Carucci, the modified system created a 360° field of sound, further enhanced by the club's low ceiling. The result was a sound system with crystal-clear music, in a room without dead spots.

Catacombs earned a reputation as a nationally recognized after-hours club, and it became known for being frequented by music-industry professionals from both Philadelphia and New York. Catacombs' most significant contribution to the music industry was its creation of the dance genre Philly Classics. Catacombs closed its doors in December 1986.

Owners 
Barry Geftman
Wayne Geftman

Disc Jockeys 
Wayne Geftman
David Todd
Billy Kennedy 
Donald Stone
Tony White
Frankie Sestito
Frank Goodman

Producers / Remix Artists / Songwriters 
David Todd – Remix artist of over 40 records for a variety of labels, including Philadelphia International Records, RCA Records and WMOT Records.
Nick Martinelli - Producer for Virgin Records, WMOT Records, West End Records, Prelude Records and more.  He went on to become “Producer To The Divas” and his client base included Diana Ross, Stephanie Mills, Five Star, Loose Ends, Phyllis Hyman, Regina Belle, Teddy Pendergrass and others.
Billy Kennedy – Remixed Direct Current's "Everybody Here Tonight Must Party"
Andy Kahn and Kurt Borusiewicz  - Writers and producers of Karen Young's Hot Shot
Mark “Marcia” Birts – writer of “Act Like You Know” – WMOT Records
Carter Burnette - Writer and producer for Whatever Productions

Promoters who regularly visited Catacombs 
David Todd – RCA Records / WMOT Records
Terri Rossi – Philadelphia International Records / SAM Records (NY) / Are & B Records (NY) / Billboard (magazine)
Fred Smith – Motown
David Steel - Polydor Records (NY)
Debbie Caponetta – ZE Records (NY)
Carter Burnette – WMOT Records
Bobby Beasley – WMOT Records
Danny Glass – SAM Records (NY)
Dan Joseph - TK Records (NY)
Izzy Sanchez – Atlantic Records (NY)
Ray Caviano – RFC Records, TK Records (NY)
Joey Carvello – RFC Records (NY)
Billy Stinger – Philadelphia Dance Music Association
Ernie Maroni – Philadelphia Organization of Professional Spinners
Frank E. Lembo – Pocono Record Pool, Ltd. (Founder & President)
Nick Duca – Motown Records
Joe Loris – Impact/Power Play (Trade Magazine)
Lenny Balk – Impact/Power Play (Trade Magazine)
Fred Dicippio – (Promoter)
John Brown – (NY)
A.J. Cervantes – Butterfly Records (NY)
Arnie Smith – Provocative Promotions (NY)
Larry Patterson – RCA Records (NY)
Franklyn Walker – Gemini Record Pool
Mi`cheLe-RenE - PHILLY*NY*BALT*WASH ★ALLL`n ALLL★PromoTionS★ MCA★ PIR★ FRESH★ eTc.

Artists that performed at Catacombs 
 Gayle Adams
 Claudja Barry
 Carl Bean
 Regina Belle
 Angela Bofill
 Taka Boom
 Jocelyn Brown
 Miquel Brown
 Sharon Brown
 Jean Carne
 Linda Clifford
 Natalie Cole 
 Sarah Dash
 Carol Douglas
 Divine
 First Choice
 Taana Gardner
 Gloria Gaynor 
 Gwen Guthrie
 Dan Hartman
 Nona Hendryx
 Jennifer Holliday 
 Loleatta Holloway
 Thelma Houston
 Rhetta Hughes 
 Geraldine Hunt 
 Phyllis Hyman
 Millie Jackson
 Carol Jiani
 The Jones Girls
 Grace Jones
 Chaka Khan 
 Gladys Knight
 Patti LaBelle
 Denise LaSalle
 Lime
 Ullanda McCullough
 Stephanie Mills
 Jackie Moore
 Melba Moore 
 Ann Peebles
 Fonda Rae
 Sheryl Lee Ralph 
 Sharon Redd
 The Ritchie Family
 Vicki Sue Robinson
 Dee Dee Sharp
 Sister Sledge
 Candi Staton
 The Three Degrees
 Donna Summer
 Sylvester
 Evelyn Thomas
 The Three Degrees
 Tina Turner
 Luther Vandross
 Tata Vega
 The Village People
 The Weather Girls
 Betty Wright
 Karen Young

See also

List of electronic dance music venues

References

External links 
  Catacombs Facebook page
 Second Story Reunion site - History
 Rosner Custom Sound - About Page

1978 establishments in Pennsylvania
1986 disestablishments in Pennsylvania
African-American music
Defunct LGBT nightclubs in the United States
LGBT history in Pennsylvania
LGBT nightclubs in Pennsylvania
Electronic dance music venues
LGBT culture in Philadelphia